Ben Williams (born 28 May 1989 in Poole, England) is a former English professional rugby union player. He plays at centre for Bath. He was forced to retire in 2015 due to an ongoing shoulder problem.

References

External links
Premiership Rugby Profile
European Professional Club Rugby Profile
Bath Profile

1989 births
Living people
Bath Rugby players
English rugby union players
Rugby union players from Poole
Rugby union centres